Teutenberg is a surname. Notable people with the surname include:

Anton Teutenberg (1840–1933), New Zealand stonemason, carver, engraver, medallist and jeweller
Ina-Yoko Teutenberg (born 1974), German former road bicycle racer
Lars Teutenberg (born 1970), German professional bicycle rider
Lea Lin Teutenberg (born 1999), German professional racing cyclist
Sven Teutenberg (born 1972), German cyclist
Tim Torn Teutenberg (born 2002), German cyclist

See also 
Teuteberg